Plötzensee Prison (JVA Plötzensee) is a juvenile prison in the Charlottenburg-Nord locality of Berlin with a capacity for 577 prisoners, operated by the State of Berlin judicial administration. The detention centre established in 1868 has a long history; it became notorious during the Nazi era as one of the main sites of capital punishment, where about 3,000 inmates were executed. Famous inmates include East Germany's last communist leader Egon Krenz.

History 
The prison was founded by resolution of the Prussian government under King William I and built until 1879 on the estates of the Plötzensee manor, named after nearby Plötzensee Lake (Plötze is the local German name of the common roach, cf. Płoć in Polish). The area divided by the Berlin-Spandau Ship Canal opened in 1859 was located at the outskirts of the Tegel forest northwest of the Berlin city limits in the Province of Brandenburg. The theologian Johann Hinrich Wichern had established the Evangelical Johannesstift borstal nearby, which in 1905 moved to Spandau–Hakenfelde. In 1915, the lands east of the canal with Plötzensee Lake were incorporated into Berlin (the present-day Wedding district), the remaining area around the prison walls became part of the Berlin Charlottenburg borough upon the 1920 Greater Berlin Act. Since 2004, it belongs to the Charlottenburg-Nord locality.

The original name of what is today Haus 1 was Strafgefängnis Plötzensee, which also translates to Plötzensee Prison. Up to 1,400 inmates lived on premises of  including a church and a Jewish prayer area, then the largest prison of the German Empire. After World War II, the buildings demolished by the bombing of Berlin were rebuilt and housed a youth detention center (Jugendstrafanstalt Berlin) for offenders between the ages of 14 and 21. When it in 1987 moved to a newly built annex on Friedrich-Olbricht-Damm in the west, Haus 1 of Plötzensee Prison again became a men's prison with capacity for 577 inmates. Upon the end of the Cold War and German reunification, the last communist East German leader Egon Krenz, convicted for manslaughter by Schießbefehl order at the Berlin Wall, from 2000 until 2003 served his sentence there.

In 1983, a modern women's prison was built south of Friedrich-Olbricht-Damm on the Bundesautobahn 100 (Stadtring) highway, since 1998 it houses the JVA Charlottenburg for about 300 adult male prisoners, mainly drug addicts.

One in three inmates of the prison is incarcerated for repeated public transport fare evasion.

Plötzensee Memorial 

During Imperial and Weimar Republic eras until 1933 there were 36 executions carried out in Plötzensee, all for murder and all by beheading with an axe according to the old German Strafgesetzbuch penal code. After the Nazi Machtergreifung, the prison housed both regular criminals and political prisoners. Plötzensee was one of eleven selected central execution sites established in 1936 throughout Germany by the order of Adolf Hitler and Reich Minister of Justice Franz Gürtner. Each was operated by a full-time executioner carrying out the rising numbers of death sentences, especially after the penal law was again tightened in World War II. By a 1943 agreement with the OKW they became also responsible for the execution of Wehrmacht members according to German military law. The convicts were beheaded by a stationary guillotine (Fallbeil), from 1942 also by hanging.

During the Nazi regime, an official record of 2,891 people convicted by the Berlin Kammergericht, the notorious "People's Court" under Roland Freisler and several Sondergerichte, were executed in Plötzensee, initially with an axe in the prison's courtyard. From 1937 the convicts were beheaded with a guillotine brought from Bruchsal Prison and installed in a backyard work shed, a ground-level brick building near the prison walls, to where the victims had to walk from a nearby cell block. In 1942, a beam was assembled in the same room, serving as gallows for up to eight victims at one time.

Executions of opponents of the Nazi regime 

About half of those executed were Germans, most of whom were sentenced to death for acts of resistance against the Nazi regime, among them members of the Red Orchestra, the 20 July plot and the Kreisau Circle. 677 executed prisoners were from Czechoslovakia, among them many members of the Czech resistance to Nazi occupation from 1938–39 onwards. 253 death sentences were carried out against Poles, and 245 against French citizens. These people included both the members of resistance organizations and people who were deported to Germany for forced labour. About 300 were women.

After execution, their bodies were released to Hermann Stieve, an anatomist at the medical college of what is now Humboldt University of Berlin. He and his students or assistants dissected them for research purposes. Stieve was especially interested in the effects of stress on the menstrual cycle, and wrote 230 papers based on this research, among them one that demonstrated that the rhythm method was not an effective method of preventing conception.

After an RAF air raid in the night of 3 September 1943 irreparably damaged the guillotine and destroyed large parts of the prison buildings, State Secretary Curt Rothenberger in the Reich Ministry of Justice via telephone ordered the immediate execution of the Plötzensee condemned. About 250 people—six of them "erroneously"— waiting in rows of eight were hanged during the so-called Plötzensee Bloody Nights from 7 to 12 September. The last execution was carried out on 20 April 1945. The remaining inmates were liberated by the Red Army in the course of the Battle of Berlin five days later.

Today the execution shed is a memorial site operated by the Memorial to the German Resistance institution to commemorate those executed by the Nazis. Separated from the prison area, it was dedicated by the Senate of Berlin on 14 September 1952 in the remaining two rooms with its drain and the preserved gallows. The guillotine had been dismantled after the war and disappeared in the Soviet occupation zone. Onto the execution room a memorial wall was built "To the Victims of Hitler's Dictatorship of the Years 1933–1945". Both institutions are site of the annual Ecumenical Plötzensee Days. Several streets in the surrounding Charlottenburg-Nord housing estates were named after executed resistance fighters.

Executed prisoners 

Abdulla Aliş (1908–1944), poet who fought in World War II; beheaded
Rita Arnould (1914–1943), resistance group member 
Judith Auer (1905–1944), resistance fighter; hanged
Bernhard Bästlein (1894–1944), communist and resistance fighter
Maurice Bavaud (1916–1941), failed assassin of Hitler; beheaded
Marianne Baum (1912–1942), anti-Nazi convicted of treason following an attack in Berlin; beheaded
Cato Bontjes van Beek (1920–1943), resistance fighter; beheaded
Karl Behrens (1909–1943), engineer and resistance fighter
Heinrich Belohlavek (1889–1943), Austrian footballer and resistance member; beheaded
Liane Berkowitz (1923–1943), resistance fighter; beheaded
Robert Bernardis (1908–1944), Austrian resistance fighter; was involved in a plot to assassinate Hitler
Irena Bernášková (1904–1942), Czech resistance fighter and journalist; beheaded
Hans-Jürgen von Blumenthal (1907–1944), aristocrat who conspired to assassinate Hitler
Hasso von Boehmer (1904–1945), lieutenant colonel who plotted to assassinate Hitler
Eugen Bolz (1881–1945), politician and resistance member
Erika von Brockdorff (1911–1943), resistance fighter; beheaded
Eduard Brücklmeier (1903–1944), diplomat and resistance fighter; hanged
Eva-Maria Buch (1921–1943), resistance fighter; beheaded
Musa Cälil (1905–1944), Soviet-Tatar resistance fighter; beheaded
Hans Coppi (1916–1942), resistance fighter; hanged
Hilde Coppi (1909–1943), Hans's wife
Alfred Corbin (1916–1943), resistance fighter
Walter Cramer (1886–1944), businessman involved in the plot to assassinate Hitler; hanged
Alfred Delp (1907–1945), jesuit priest falsely implicated for plotting to overthrow Hitler
Heinrich zu Dohna-Schlobitten (1882–1944), major general and resistance fighter
Charlotte Eisenblätter (1903–1944), Anti-Nazi activist
Hans Otto Erdmann (1896–1944), Army officer involved in the plot to assassinate Hitler; hanged
Benita von Falkenhayn (1900–1935), baroness and spy; beheaded by axe
Erich Fellgiebel (1886–1944), army general who plotted to assassinate Hitler
Eberhard Finckh (1899–1944), colonel and resistance member; hanged
Reinhold Frank (1896–1945), lawyer involved in the plot to assassinate Hitler; hanged
Julius Fučík (1903–1943), journalist accused of high treason
Willi Gall (1908–1941), communist and resistance fighter; beheaded
Jakob Gapp (1897–1943), Austrian roman catholic priest and anti-Nazi activist; beheaded
Charlotte Garske (1906–1943), political activist who opposed the Nazi government
Erich Garske (1907–1943), husband of Charlotte
Erwin Gehrts (1890–1943), socialist and resistance fighter; beheaded
Erich and Elizabeth Gloeden, and Elisabeth Kuznitzky, entire family beheaded for sheltering a conspirator in 1944
Carl Friedrich Goerdeler (1884–1945), politician who opposed the Holocaust; hanged
Fritz Goerdeler (1886–1945), Carl's brother; hanged
Ursula Goetze (1916–1943), resistance fighter; beheaded
Helene Gotthold (1896–1944), Jehovah's Witness who opposed the Nazis; beheaded
John Graudenz (1884–1942), journalist and resistance fighter; strangled
Medardo Griotto (1901–1943), militant communist activist; beheaded
Nikolaus Gross (1898–1945), Roman Catholic falsely arrested for the attempted assassination of Hitler
Alfred Grünberg (1902–1942), Communist party member and resistance fighter; hanged
Wilhelm Guddorf (1902–1943), Belgian journalist and resistance fighter
Hans Bernd von Haeften (1905–1944), jurist who conspired to assassinate Hitler
Albrecht von Hagen (1904–1944), jurist and resistance fighter; hanged
Otto and Elise Hampel, couple who protested against the Nazis; beheaded
Georg Hansen (1904–1944), Army colonel and resistance fighter; hanging
Arvid Harnack (1901–1942), jurist and resistance fighter; beheaded
Ernst von Harnack (1888–1945), Prussian official and resistance fighter
Mildred Harnack (1902–1943), American teacher and resistance fighter; beheaded
Paul von Hase (1885–1944), career soldier and resistance fighter; hanged
Ulrich von Hassell (1881–1944), diplomat and resistance member; hanged
Elli Hatschek (1901–1944), resistance member; beheaded
Theodor Haubach (1896–1945), journalist and resistance fighter
Egbert Hayessen (1913–1944), resistance fighter; hanged
Wolf-Heinrich Graf von Helldorf (1896–1944), police official involved in the plot to assassinate Hitler; hanged
Horst Heilmann (1923–1942), resistance fighter; hanged
Albert Hensel (1895–1942), communist and resistance fighter
Otto Herfurth (1893–1944), general involved in the plot to assassinate Hitler; hanged
Liselotte Herrmann (1909–1938), communist resistance fighter; beheaded
Helmut Himpel (1907–1943), dentist and resistance fighter; hanged
Helmut Hirsch (1916–1937), German Jew arrested for taking part in a bombing; decapitated
Erich Hoepner (1886–1944), General who conspired to assassinate Hitler
Caesar von Hofacker (1896–1944), lieutenant colonel who plotted to assassinate Hitler; hanged
Rosa Hofmann (1919–1943), Communist youth leader and resistance activist
Bedřich Homola (1887–1943), Czech soldier and anti-Nazi commander
Roland von Hößlin (1915–1944), army officer who plotted to assassinate Hitler
Helmuth Hübener (1925–1942), youth who opposed the Nazi regime; was the youngest prisoner ever executed at age 17; beheaded
Walter Husemann (1909–1943), communist and resistance fighter; beheaded
Richard Hüttig (1908–1934), communist accused of attempted murder and breach of peace; beheaded by axe
Hildegard Jadamowitz (1916–1942), communist activist
Friedrich Gustav Jaeger (1895–1944), resistance fighter; hanged
Heinz Joachim (1919–1942), anti-government resistance group member
Marianne Joachim (1921–1943), Heinz's wife
Wanda Kallenbach (1902–1944), was charged with undermining the war and helping the enemy; beheaded
Heinz Kapelle (1913–1941), YCLG member accused of high treason
Walter Küchenmeister (1897–1943), machine technician and resistance fighter
Otto Kiep (1886–1944), resistance fighter; hanged
Johanna Kirchner (1889–1944), opponent of the Nazi regime; beheaded
Hans Georg Klamroth (1898–1944), officer involved in the plot to assassinate Hitler
Friedrich Klausing (1920–1944), resistance fighter who plotted to assassinate Hitler
Ewald von Kleist-Schmenzin (1890–1945), lawyer who plotted to assassinate Hitler
Theodor Korselt (1891–1943), jurist who negatively influenced Germany's fighting forces
Alfred Kranzfelder (1908–1944), naval officer and resistance member; hanged
Anna Krauss (1884–1943), fortune teller and resistance fighter; beheaded
Karlrobert Kreiten (1916–1943), pianist accused of making negative remarks about Hitler; hanged
Adam Kuckhoff (1887–1943), writer and resistance member
Ingeborg Kummerow (1912–1943), office worker charged with aiding and abetting espionage; beheaded
Carl Langbehn (1901–1944), lawyer and resistance member; hanged
Krista Lavíčková (1917–1944), Czech secretary who fought against Nazism; beheaded
Julius Leber (1891–1945), politician and resistance member
Heinrich Graf von Lehndorff-Steinort (1909–1944), East Prussian aristocrat who plotted to assassinate Hitler; hanged
Paul Lejeune-Jung (1882–1944), lawyer and resistance fighter; hanged
Ludwig Freiherr von Leonrod (1906–1944), Army officer who plotted to assassinate Hitler; hanged
Bernhard Letterhaus (1894–1944), unionist and Nazi resistance member
Franz Leuninger (1898–1945), politician and resistance member
Wilhelm Leuschner (1890–1944), trade unionist involved in the plot to assassinate Hitler
Herta Lindner (1920–1943), resistance fighter
Hans Otfried von Linstow (1899–1944), Army colonel who plotted to assassinate Hitler
Hildegard Löwy (1922–1943), office worker and anti-Nazi resistance member; beheaded
Ferdinand von Lüninck (1888–1944), officer involved in the plot to assassinate Hitler; hanged
Mikhail Varfolomeevich Makarov (1915-c.1942), possibly; was a career spy
Rudolf von Marogna-Redwitz (1886–1944), colonel who plotted to assassinate Hitler; hanged
Hermann Maaß (1897–1944), resistance member 
Michael von Matuschka (1888–1944), politician who plotted to assassinate Hitler
Basile Maximovitch (1902-c.1943), Russian aristocrat; beheaded
Anna Maximovitch (1901-c.1943), sister of Basile
Joachim Meichssner (1906–1944), army officer and resistance member
Herbert Michaelis (1898–1939), resistance member
Helmuth James Graf von Moltke (1907–1945), jurist accused of treason
Renate von Natzmer (1898–1935), spy; beheaded by axe
Arthur Nebe (1894–1945), Nazi convicted of treason
Eugen Neutert (1905–1943), communist and resistance fighter
Johann Nobis (1899–1940), conscientious objector
Véra Obolensky (1911–1944), French resistance fighter; beheaded
Ruth Oesterreich (1894–1943), anti-government activist; hanged
Paul Ogorzow (1912–1941), serial killer; beheaded
Erwin Planck (1893–1945), politician and resistance fighter; hanged
Johannes Popitz (1884–1945), Prussian finance minister and resistance member; hanged
Karl Ernst Rahtgens (1908–1944), officer and resistance fighter; hanged
Rudolf Redlinghofer (1900–1940), conscientious objector 
Friedrich Rehmer (1921–1943), factory worker and resistance fighter
Adolf Rembte (1902–1937), communist and resistance fighter; beheaded
Adolf Reichwein (1898–1944), educator who resisted German policies
John Rittmeister (1898–1943), neurologist and resistance fighter; beheaded
Alexis von Roenne (1903–1944), colonel accused of plotting to assassinate Hitler
Galina Romanova (1918–1944), Ukrainian doctor and resistance fighter; beheaded
Joachim Sadrozinski (1907–1944), Army officer who plotted to assassinate Hitler
Lothar Salinger (1919–1943), resistant activist
Rudolf von Scheliha (1897–1942), aristocrat and resistance fighter; hanged
Rose Schlösinger (1907–1943), social worker and resistance fighter; beheaded
Oda Schottmüller (1905–1943), dancer and resistance fighter; beheaded
Friedrich-Werner Graf von der Schulenburg (1875–1944), diplomat who plotted to assassinate Hitler; hanged
Fritz-Dietlof von der Schulenburg (1902–1944), son of Friedrich-Werner; hanged
Harro Schulze-Boysen (1909–1942), publicist convicted of high treason; hanged
Libertas Schulze-Boysen (1913–1942), Harro's wife
Elisabeth Schumacher (1904–1942), artist and resistance fighter
Kurt Schumacher (1905–1942), anti-fascist group member; hanged
Friedrich Schumann (1893–1921), serial killer; beheaded by axe
Wilhelm Schürmann-Horster (1900–1943), marxist communist; hanged 
Ludwig Schwamb (1890–1945), jurist and resistance fighter; hanged
Ulrich Wilhelm Graf Schwerin von Schwanenfeld (1902–1944), landowner and resistance fighter; hanged
Gertrud Seele (1917–1945), nurse and social worker who helped Jews; beheaded 
Fritz Siedentopf (1908–1944), communist and resistance fighter; beheaded
Franz Sperr (1878–1945), resistance member; hanged
Günther Smend (1912–1944), officer who plotted to assassinate Hitler; hanged
Robert Stamm (1900–1937), politician who conspired to commit treason; beheaded
Berthold Schenk Graf von Stauffenberg (1905–1944), aristocrat who plotted to assassinate Hitler
Helmuth Stieff (1901–1944), general involved in the plot to assassinate Hitler
Ilse Stöbe (1911–1942), journalist and resistance fighter; beheaded
Heinz Strelow (1915–1943), journalist and resistance fighter; beheaded
Carl-Heinrich von Stülpnagel (1886–1944), General convicted of treason
Maria Terwiel (1910–1943), resistance fighter; beheaded
Elisabeth von Thadden (1890–1944), progressive educator and resistance fighter; beheaded
Fritz Thiele (1894–1944), resistance member; hanged
Fritz Thiel (1916–1943), engineer and resistance fighter; not the same man above 
Busso Thoma (1899–1945), major who plotted to assassinate Hitler; hanged
Adam von Trott zu Solz (1909–1944), lawyer who conspired to assassinate Hitler
Nikolaus von Üxküll-Gyllenband (1877–1944), businessman who conspired to assassinate Hitler
Peter Yorck von Wartenburg (1904–1944), jurist and resistance fighter
Hermann Josef Wehrle (1899–1944), Catholic priest involved in the plot to assassinate Hitler
Carl Wentzel (1875–1944), farmer involved in the plot to assassinate Hitler
Josef Wirmer (1901–1944), jurist and resistance fighter; hanged
Erwin von Witzleben (1881–1944), field marshal who conspired to assassinate Hitler
Irene Wosikowski (1910–1944), political activist; beheaded
Emmy Zehden (1900–1944), Jehovah's Witness and resistance member; beheaded

See also 
 Brandenburg-Görden Prison

References

Sources

External links 

Plötzensee Memorial Center ebook published by the German Resistance Memorial Center Berlin
Plötzensee Memorial 
Plötzensee Prison homepage 

Prisons in Germany
Buildings and structures in Charlottenburg-Wilmersdorf
 
Heritage sites in Berlin
Execution sites
Men's prisons